A willow is any of the several hundred species of deciduous trees and shrubs in the genus Salix.

Willow or willows may also refer to:

Places

Australia
 Willows, Queensland
 Willow Tree, New South Wales
 Willows Sports Complex, Townsville

Canada
 Willows, Saskatchewan, an unincorporated community in the Rural Municipality of Lake of the Rivers No. 72
 The Willows, Saskatoon, a neighbourhood in Saskatoon, Saskatchewan, Canada
 Willow Bunch, Saskatchewan
 Willows Beach, Victoria, British Columbia

United Kingdom
 The Willows, Salford, home of Salford City Reds rugby league club
 Willow Tearooms, tearooms at 217 Sauchiehall Street, Glasgow, Scotland
 Willows and Wetlands Visitor Centre, Stoke St Gregory, Somerset
 Ferry Hinksey Road (AKA Willow Walk), a footpath in Oxford

United States
 Willow, Alaska
 Willow, former name of Willows, California
 Willow, Florida, an unincorporated area in Manatee County, Florida
 Willow, Illinois
 Willow, Kentucky
 Willow, Bracken County, Kentucky; see Kentucky Route 22
 Willow, Lee County, Kentucky
 Willow, New York, a hamlet in Ulster County, New York
 Willow, Oklahoma
 Willow, Wisconsin, a town in Richland County, Wisconsin
 Willow Branch, Indiana
 Willow City, North Dakota
 Willow Glen, San Jose, California
 Willow Island, Nebraska
 Willow Street station, a station on the Blue line of the Los Angeles County Metropolitan Transportation Authority
 Willow Meadows, Houston, Texas
 Willow, Michigan, unincorporated community
 Willow Oak, Florida
 Willow Street, Pennsylvania
 Willows, California
 Willow, Wisconsin
 Willows, Wisconsin, a fictional populated place
 Salem Willows, Salem, Massachusetts

People
 Willow (given name), a female name
Willow, a persona of professional wrestler Jeff Hardy (born 1977)

Books
 Blue Willow, a Newbery Honor book written by Doris Gates
 Old Man Willow, an evil character in the J. R. R. Tolkien novel The Fellowship of the Ring
 Wicked Willow, three original novels based on the U.S. television series Buffy the Vampire Slayer
 Willow (Dreadstar), a fictional telepath created by Jim Starlin for the comic series Dreadstar
 Willow & Tara, an anthology in the Buffy the Vampire franchise
 "The Willow Song", sung by Desdemona in Shakespeare's play Othello
 The Willow Tree, a play by Joseph Henry McAlpin Benrimo
 "The Willows" (story), a short story by Algernon Blackwood

Film and TV
 The Willow Tree (1920 film), a 1920 American silent film based on the McAlpin Benrimo play
 The Willow Tree (2005 film), a 2005 Iranian film directed by Majid Majidi
 Willow (2019 film) a 2019 Macedonian film, directed by Milcho Manchevski
 Willow, a cat on the BBC television show Blue Peter
 Willow (film), a 1988 fantasy film, directed by Ron Howard, with a story by George Lucas
 Willow (TV channel), an American sports channel focused on cricket
 Willow (TV series), an American sequel TV series for the 1988 movie of the same name

Characters
 Catherine Willows, a character in CSI: Crime Scene Investigation
 Grandmother Willow, a character in Disney's Pocahontas and Pocahontas II: Journey to a New World
 Lindsey Willows, a secondary character in CSI: Crime Scene Investigation
 Willow, a mutant character created by Marvel Comics for their Marvel 2099 run X-Nation 2099
 Willow Rosenberg, a character in Buffy the Vampire Slayer
 Willow Stark, a character in Days of Our Lives
 Willow Ufgood, the title character from the 1988 film Willow
 A character from Tangled: The Series
 A playable character in the indie survival game Don't Starve and its sequel Don't Starve Together
 A character in the 1973 film The Wicker Man
 A character in The Wicker Man (2006 film)
 A bird in the video game Angry Birds Stella and The Angry Birds Movie
 Willow Park, a character in The Owl House
 Willow Schnee, a character in RWBY
 Professor Willow, a major NPC in the AR mobile game Pokémon GO

Video gaming
 Willow, a 1989 platform game based on the 1988 film of the same name
 Willow, a 1989 video game based on the 1988 film

Music
 Willow Smith, American singer and actress known mononymously as WILLOW
 The Willows (trio), Canadian musical group
 White Willow (band), an art rock band from Norway
 Willow flute, a Scandinavian folk flute
 The Willow Pattern, a one-act comic opera with a libretto by Basil Hood and music by Cecil Cook

Songs
 Weeping Willow (rag), a rag by Scott Joplin
 "Weeping Willow" (song), a song by the Verve from the album Urban Hymns
 "Willow" (song), a song by Taylor Swift from Evermore
 "Willow", a song by Joan Armatrading from the album Show Some Emotion
 "Willow", a song by Said the Whale from the album Hawaiii
 "Willow", a song by Scale the Summit from the album The Migration
 "Willow", a song from the musical Venice
 "Willow song", Desdemona's song in operatic settings of Shakespeare's play Othello
 "Willow's Song", a song composed by American composer Paul Giovanni with lyrics by Robert Burns
 "Willows", by Vanessa Carlton from Liberman
 "Tit-willow", Koko's song in the 1885 Gilbert and Sullivan comic opera The Mikado

Science
 Pussy willow, a name for several species of willow, when bearing their furry catkins
 Seep willow, Baccharis salicifolia, a flowering shrub from the south-west United States and northern Mexico
 Willo (Thescelosaurus), a dinosaur fossil thought to include a fossilized heart
 Willow oak (Quercus phellos), a species of oak with willow-like leaves
 Willow-herb, any of the herbaceous plants in the genus Epilobium, many of which have willow-like leaves

Other
 The Allied reporting name for the Japanese biplane trainer Yokosuka K5Y during the Second World War
 USCGC Willow, several U.S. Coast Guard cutters
 Willow (calico cat), travelled 1,800 miles from Colorado to New York City, reunited with owners in 2011 after 5 years
 Willow (Joe Biden's cat), cat owned by U.S. President Joe Biden
 Willow Man, large outdoor sculpture by Serena de la Hey
 Willow pattern, also known as Blue Willow, distinctive and elaborate pattern used on some pottery plates
 Willow project, oil development project in Alaska
 Willey (textile machine), also willey, willow, twilley
 Willow Tree (figurines)
 Willow (typeface), typeface that was designed by Tony Forster in 1990
 Willows, an API for Unix systems to allow recompilation of Windows programs for Linux, featured by Caldera OpenLinux
 Golden Willow (horse), the youngest horse to ever win the Badminton Horse Trials
 A cricket bat, which is made of willow tree wood

See also

 The Willows (disambiguation)
 Willow Tree (disambiguation)
 
 
 Willow Creek (disambiguation)
 Willow Grove (disambiguation)
 Willow Hill (disambiguation)
 Willow Island (disambiguation)
 Willow Lake (disambiguation)
 Willow Park (disambiguation)
 Willow River (disambiguation)
 Willow Run (disambiguation)
 Willow School (disambiguation)
 Willow Springs (disambiguation)
 Willow Township (disambiguation)
 Willow Valley (disambiguation)
 The Wind in the Willows (disambiguation)